The following is a list of notable deaths in September 2003.

Entries for each day are listed alphabetically by surname. A typical entry lists information in the following sequence:
 Name, age, country of citizenship at birth, subsequent country of citizenship (if applicable), reason for notability, cause of death (if known), and reference.

September 2003

1
Rand Brooks, 84, American film actor (Gone with the Wind, Babes in Arms, The Adventures of Rin Tin Tin).
Sir Terry Frost, 87, British artist.
John Gould, 94, American columnist, humorist and essayist, published in most major American newspapers and magazines.
Sir John Gray, 66, British diplomat.
Héctor Rodríguez, 83, Cuban baseball player (Chicago White Sox).
Ramón Serrano Suñer, 101, Spanish politician.

2
Thomas Neville Bonner, 80, American medical historian, institution president: New Hampshire, Union College, Wayne State
Katherine Sui Fun Cheung, 98, Chinese aviator.
Hroar Dege, 82/83, Norwegian restaurateur.
George Chubb, 3rd Baron Hayter, 92, British politician and industrialist.
Nehemiah Levanon, 88, Israeli intelligence agent and diplomat.
Pravin Singh, 48, Fijian politician, traffic collision.
Bruce Waibel, 45, American musician and bass guitar player (FireHouse, Gregg Allman Band, Santana).
Peter West, 83, British BBC presenter and sports commentator, best known for his cricket, tennis and rugby coverage.

3
Jack Daniels, 79, American politician.
Raymond G. Davis, 88, United States Marine Corps four-star-general, heart attack.
Paul Hill, 49, American anti-abortion activist; executed for a double murder.
Rudolf Leiding, 88, German chairman of the Volkswagen automobile company.
Andrzej Nartowski, 71, Polish basketball player (basketball at the 1960 Summer Olympics).
Elias Petropoulos, 75, Greek author, folklorist and urban historian, cancer.
Norman Porteous, 104, theologian and writer on Old Testament issues.

4
Ben Aris, 66, English actor (Hi-de-Hi!, The Charge of the Light Brigade, Stepping Out).
Béla H. Bánáthy, 83, Hungarian-American educator, systems and design scientist and author.
Susan Chilcott, 40, English opera singer, breast cancer.
Penny Dwyer, 49, English comedian.
Charles A. Gabriel, 75, Chief of Staff of the United States Air Force, Alzheimer's disease.
David P. Robbins, 61, American mathematician.
Tibor Varga, 82, Hungarian violinist, conductor and pedagogue.
Evangelos Yannopoulos, 85, Greek lawyer and politician (Minister of Justice).

5
Gordon Binkerd, 87, American composer, pianist and professor.
C. H. Sisson, 89, British writer and poet.
Harley Grossman, 73, American baseball player (Washington Senators).
Sir Richard Harrison, 82, New Zealand politician.
Sir Ian Hunter, 84, British classical music impresario.
Gisele MacKenzie, 76, Canadian-born singer and entertainer.
James Rachels, 62, American philosopher, cancer.
Benny Schnoor, 80, Danish Olympic cyclist.

6
Charles E. Bennett, 92, American politician (U.S. Representative for Florida's 2nd and 3rd congressional districts).
Marshall Joseph Caifano, 92, Italian-American Chicago Outfit and Las Vegas mobster.
Jules Engel, Jules Engel, 94, American filmmaker, visual artist, and film director.
Marie Foster, 85, American civil rights movement leader.
Harry Goz, 71, American musical theater actor (Fiddler on the Roof) and voice actor (Sealab 2021).
Kevin Morgan, 82, Australian politician.
John Ross, 62, Australian politician.
Wilbur Snapp, 83, American musician, stadium organist for the Clearwater Phillies and the Philadelphia Phillies.

7
Great Antonio, 77, Croatian-Canadian strongman, wrestler, actor and eccentric.
Basant Kumar Biswal, 67, Indian politician.
Lloyd Humphreys, 89, American psychologist and methodologist.
Ivan Margitych, 82, Ukrainian Greek Catholic bishop.
Joe McDonald, 74, Scottish footballer.
Rudy Mobley, 81, American football player.
Mohammad Oraz, Iranian mountaineer, avalanche.
Robert Weinman, 88, American sculptor and "one of the nation's most accomplished medallic artists".
Merv Wellington, 62, New Zealand politician (Member of Parliament for Manurewa, Papakura).
Warren Zevon, 56, American singer and songwriter, cancer.

8
Jaclyn Linetsky, 17, Canadian voice actress (Caillou, 15/Love, What's with Andy?), road accident.
Doris Ogilvie, 91, Canadian diver and Olympian.
Gulabrai Ramchand, 76, Indian cricketer.
Leni Riefenstahl, 101, German filmmaker.
Caroline St John-Brooks, 56, Anglo-Irish education journalist.

9
Thomas Allibone, 99, English physicist, focused on high voltage phenomena, nuclear fusion and particle physics.
David Applebaum, 51, American-born Israeli physician, suicide bomb victim.
Andrei Folbert, 72, Romanian basketball player.
Larry Hovis, 67, American actor (Hogan's Heroes).
Sir Francis Purchas, 84, British jurist.
Edward Teller, 95, American physicist, "Father of the H-Bomb".
Marthe Vogt, 100, German neuroscientist, contributed to the understanding of neurotransmitters in the brain.
Don Willesee, 87, Australian politician, member of the Australian Senate representing Western Australia.

10
Tata Esteban, 48, Filipino film producer and director, heart attack.
Larry Allen Hayes, 54, American spree killer, execution by lethal injection.
Lee Kyung-hae, South Korean farmer and activist, suicide.
Martin Page, 65, British writer and journalist, heart problems.
Ruth Hill Useem, 88, American sociologist and anthropologist.

11
Ben Bril, 91, Dutch boxer (men's flyweight boxing at the 1928 Summer Olympics).
James Edward Fitzgerald, 64, American Roman Catholic prelate.
Stuart Golland, 58, English actor (Heartbeat).
Anna Lindh, 46, Swedish foreign minister, stabbed.
John Ritter, 54, American actor (Three's Company, Clifford The Big Red Dog, 8 Simple Rules), Emmy winner (1984), aortic dissection.

12
Johnny Cash, 71, American Hall of Fame country singer ("Folsom Prison Blues", "I Walk the Line", "Ring of Fire"), diabetes.
David Dahlin, 86, American physician and pathologist.
Chappie Fox, 90, American circus historian.
Brian Plummer, 67, British writer and dog breeder.
Patrick Wilson, 75, American librarian, philosopher, professor and author.

13
Inam Ahmed, 71, Bangladeshi actor.
George Boothman, 86, Canadian professional ice hockey player (Toronto Maple Leafs).
Ron Burton, 67, American professional football player (Northwestern, Boston Patriots).
Howard D. Graves, 64, United States Army officer, cancer.
Frank O'Bannon, 73, American politician, Governor of Indiana (since 1997).
Kenneth Walter, 63, South African cricketer.
Johnny Welaj, 89, American baseball player (Washington Senators, Philadelphia Athletics).

14
Donald O. Clifton, 79, American psychologist, author, researcher, and entrepreneur.
Garrett Hardin, 88, American ecologist and philosopher.
Ken Kifer, 57, American cyclist and writer.
Yetunde Price, 31, half-sister of Venus and Serena Williams, murdered in a shooting.
John Serry Sr., 88, Italian American musician composer and arranger.
Taya Zinkin, 84, English journalist and author.

15
Garner Ted Armstrong, 73, American television evangelist.
Jack Brymer, 88, British clarinetist (Royal Philharmonic Orchestra, BBC Symphony Orchestra, London Symphony Orchestra).
Donald Cameron, 75, Scottish rugby union player.
Arnold Doren, 68, American photographer.

16
Donald Deacon, 83, Canadian politician, leukemia.
John Orrell, 68, British author, theatre historian and English professor, cancer.
Sheb Wooley, 82, American actor (High Noon, Rawhide) and singer (The Purple People Eater).

17
Yitzhak Artzi, 82, Israeli politician.
Derek Bryan, 92, British diplomat, sinologist and teacher.
Lewis Clark, 79, Canadian politician.
George Gale, 74, British cartoonist.
Leendert Ginjaar, 75, Dutch politician.
Erich Hallhuber, 52, German actor.
Ray Harvey, 74, Australian rules footballer.
George Sawaya, 80, American actor and stuntman.
Neal Wood, 81, American-British political theorist and author.

18
Robert G. Bartle, 75, American mathematician, specialized in real analysis, known for writing popular mathematics textbooks.
Harry Birrell, 75, South African cricketer and schoolmaster.
Samuel Delbert Clark, 93, Canadian sociologist.
Pauline Crawley, 79, American baseball player (AAGPBL)
Jean Dieuzaide, 82, French photographer.
Emil Fackenheim, 87, German Jewish philosopher and Reform rabbi.
Richard A. Howard, 86, American botanist and plant taxonomist.
Don Reese, 52, American professional football player (Miami Dolphins, New Orleans Saints), liver cancer.

19
Slim Dusty, 76, Australian country music singer-songwriter, guitarist and producer.
Alfred Grislawski, 83, German fighter pilot during World War II.
Ellen Idelson, 42, American television producer, television writer and actress, complications from cancer and Crohn's disease.
Arthur Kinoy, 82, American attorney and civil rights leader.
Herbert Kutscha, 86, German Luftwaffe fighter ace and recipient of the Knight's Cross of the Iron Cross during World War II.
Frank Lowe, 60, American jazz saxophonist, lung cancer.
Adrian Shelford, 39, New Zealand rugby footballer, heart attack.
Jim Thompson, 67, British Anglican bishop.

20
Ghulam Ahmad, 80, Pakistani forestry official.
Robert Blake, Baron Blake, 86, English historian and life peer, known for his biography of Benjamin Disraeli.
Tom Busby, 66, Canadian actor (The War Lover, The Dirty Dozen, Heavenly Pursuits).
Lorenzo Calonga, 74, Paraguayan footballplayer.
Sonora Webster Carver, 99, American entertainer.
Gordon Mitchell, 80, American actor and bodybuilder.
Simon Muzenda, 80, Zimbabwean politician and vice-President of Zimbabwe.
Maurizio Romano, 37, Italian voice actor, traffic collision.
Vernon Singer, 84, politician in Ontario, Canada.
Russell L. De Valois, 76, American psychological and cognitive scientist, pioneering research on spatial and color vision.
Gareth Williams, Baron Williams of Mostyn, 62, British Cabinet minister, Leader of the House of Lords.

21
Robert H. Lochner, 84, American journalist and interpreter of John F. Kennedy with the "Ich bin ein Berliner" speech.
Pamela Gordon, 66, American actress.
Lu Ann Simms, 71, American singer.
Otis A. Singletary, 81, American  historian.

22
Howard Austen, 74, American companion, long-time confidant and companion of Gore Vidal.
Sir Allan Gilmour, 86, Scottish soldier and politician.
Gordon Jump, 71, American actor (WKRP in Cincinnati).
Tony Shryane, 84, British radio producer.
Hugo Young, 64, British journalist and political commentator (The Guardian, The Observer).

23
Rosalie Allen, 79, American country musician and television and radio host, known as Queen of the Yodelers.
Earl Brown, 87, American football and basketball player and coach (Auburn).
Zofia Chądzyńska, 91, Polish writer and translator.
Simcha Dinitz, 74, Israeli statesman and politician.
Donald Nicol, 80, English Byzantinist.
Sarah Parkinson, 41, British producer and writer, breast cancer.
Mirta Plá, 63, Cuban dancer.
Zubayr Al-Rimi, 29, militant in al-Qaeda's Saudi wing, killed by Saudi security forces.
Rex Robbins, 68, American actor of stage and screen, stroke.
Yuri Senkevich, 66, Soviet doctor and scientist, heart failure.

24
Yoshinobu Ashihara, 85, Japanese architect.
Lyle Bettger, 88, American actor (The Greatest Show on Earth, Nevada Smith, Hawaii Five-O).
Hugh Gregg, 85, American politician, Governor of New Hampshire  (1953-1955)
Derek Prince, 88, English biblical scholar and author.
Edward Said, 67, Palestinian scholar, leukemia.

25
Alastair Borthwick, 90, Scottish author and broadcaster.
John Clayton, 63, Australian actor.
Dai Davies, 78, Welsh rugby player.
Herb Gardner, 68, American artist and writer.
Franco Modigliani, 85, Italian Nobel Prize-winning economist. 
Donald Nicol, 80, English Byzantine scholar.
George Plimpton, 76, American author, editor, socialite & actor.
Bill Wolfgramm, 77, Tongan musician, specialized in lap steel guitar and Hawaiian music.

26
Olle Anderberg, 84, Swedish wrestler (1948 Olympic silver medal, 1952 Olympic gold medal).
Glyn Gilbert, 83, British Army general.
Shawn Lane, 40, American guitarist and composer.
Robert Palmer, 54, British singer, heart attack.
Robert Raymond, 81, Australian television pioneer.
David Williams, 77, Welsh advertising executive and crime writer.

27
Red Barbary, 83, American baseball player (Washington Senators).
Robert Albert Bauer, 93, Austrian-American U.S. Foreign Service officer, Voice of America announcer, editor and author.
Tom Brennan, 81, American ice hockey player (Boston Bruins).
Paul Burlison, 74, American rockabilly guitarist and a founding member of The Rock and Roll Trio.
Donald J. Mitchell, 80, American politician and member of the United States House of Representatives for New York.
Donald O'Connor, 78, American actor, singer and dancer (Singin' in the Rain, Yes Sir, That's My Baby).
Wendy Wyland, 38, American Olympic diver (bronze medal in women's 10 metre platform at the 1984 Summer Olympics).
Masahiro Yoshimura, 66, Japanese Olympic swimmer (silver medal in 200 metre breaststroke at the 1956 Summer Olympics).

28
Knud Albjerg, 73, Danish sprint canoer (men's 1000 metres K-1 single-man sprint kayaks at the 1952 Summer Olympics).
Dany Bébel-Gisler, 68, Guadeloupean sociolinguist, ethnologist and author, preservationist of Creole languages.
Sir Christopher Foxley-Norris, 86, British Air Chief Marshal.
Althea Gibson, 76, African-American tennis player.
Elia Kazan, 94, American film director (A Streetcar Named Desire, On the Waterfront, East of Eden).
Ephraim Oshry, 94/95, Lithuanian-American Orthodox rabbi, author and Holocaust-survivor.
Marshall Rosenbluth, 76, American academic and plasma physicist.

29
Wesley Tuttle, 85, American country music singer.
Raoul Gregory Vitale, 75, Syrian musicologist .
Jack Wedley, 85–86, Canadian football player.
Beatrice Blyth Whiting, 89, American anthropologist, a pioneer in the comparative study of child development.

30
Yusuf Bey, 67, American Black Muslim activist and leader, cancer.
Ronnie Dawson, 64, American rockabilly singer, guitarist and drummer.
Ashley Greenwood, 91, British soldier, lawyer, and judge.
John Hawkesworth, 82, English television/film producer and writer.
Robert Kardashian, 59, American criminal defense lawyer, esophageal cancer.
John Rosenbaum, 70, American kinetic sculptor.
Edouard Wah, Haitian painter.
Helen Van Pelt Wilson, 101, American garden writer.

References 

2003-09
 09